The 2018–19 Serie A (known as the Serie A TIM for sponsorship reasons) was the 117th season of top-tier Italian football, the 87th in a round-robin tournament, and the 9th since its organization under a league committee separate from Serie B. Juventus were the seven-time defending champions and defended their title following their victory against Fiorentina on 20 April 2019. The season was run from 18 August 2018 to 26 May 2019.

Events
Hellas Verona and Benevento immediately returned to Serie B after finishing 19th and 20th while Crotone, finishing in 18th place, were relegated after two seasons in the top flight.

On 28 April, Empoli earned the right to come back to Serie A after one year of relegation. On 18 May 2018, Parma achieved promotion having finished second in the 2017–18 Serie B season, just three seasons after their bankruptcy relegation to Serie D. The last team promoted, after 2 years of absence, was Frosinone, who defeated Palermo in the Serie B play-off finals 3–2 on aggregate.

On 23 July, Parma were handed a 5-point deduction for the 2018–19 Serie A season, following text messages from Parma player Emanuele Calaiò "eliciting a reduced effort" from two players of Spezia during the 2017–18 season, a match Parma won 2–0 to secure promotion to this season. On 9 August, Parma had the 5-point deduction expunged.

On 14 August, the day of the Ponte Morandi bridge collapse in Genoa, the Italian Football Federation announced a minute's silence would be added for the victims of the collapse before all Serie A matches during the opening weekend that succeeded the incident. On 16 August, the Lega Serie A postponed the opening matches for both Genoese clubs Genoa and Sampdoria that were originally scheduled for 19 August.

On 13 September, Chievo was deducted 3 points after being found guilty of false accounting.

On 14 April 2019, Chievo was relegated from Serie A after a 3–1 defeat by Napoli, ending an eleven-year spell in the top flight.

On 20 April, Juventus won their 35th title and their eighth in a row with a win over Fiorentina.

On 5 May, Frosinone was relegated from Serie A after a 2–2 draw away at Sassuolo, going down after just one season.

On 26 May, Atalanta finished third and secured a place in the Champions League group stage, both for the first time in their history. Meanwhile, Empoli which were one point above the relegation zone ahead of Genoa, were eventually relegated to Serie B after they were defeated by Internazionale, while Genoa drew with Fiorentina.

This was also the last season of iconic Roma captain Daniele De Rossi that left the team after 18 seasons, while veterans Sergio Pellissier (from Chievo), Andrea Barzagli (from Juventus) and Emiliano Moretti (from Torino) retired from professional football at the end of the season.

Teams

Stadiums and locations

Personnel and kits

Managerial changes

League table

Results

Season statistics

Top goalscorers

1 Piątek played for Genoa until matchday 20 and scored 13 goals.

Hat-tricks

Note
4 Player scored four goals ; (H) – Home  (A) – Away

Clean sheets

Awards
In 2019, Serie A introduced the Serie A Awards for the first time, using calculations from Opta Sports and Netco Sports to determine the best players of the season.

Number of teams by region

References

External links

 
 ESPN Italian Serie A

Serie A seasons
Italy
1